Carlactone synthase (CCD8 (gene), MAX4 (gene), NCED8 (gene)) is an enzyme with systematic name 9-cis-10'-apo-beta-carotenal:O2 oxidoreductase (14,15-cleaving, carlactone-forming). This enzyme catalyses the following chemical reaction

 9-cis-10'-apo-beta-carotenal + 2 O2  carlactone + (2E,4E,6E)-7-hydroxy-4-methylhepta-2,4,6-trienal

Carlactone synthase contains Fe2+.

References

External links 
 

EC 1.13.11